Yenkit is a resort town in Muscat Governorate, in northeastern Oman.
A $2 billion integrated tourism resort is being built at Yenkit.

References

External links
Official site

Populated places in the Muscat Governorate